Acacia aneura var. aneura is a shrub or tree which grows from 4 m to 6 m in height.  It is native to Australia

See also
List of Acacia species

References

External links
 Flora of Australia Volume 11B (2001) figure 67.

aneura var. aneura
aneura
Flora of New South Wales
Flora of the Northern Territory
Flora of Queensland
Flora of South Australia
Acacias of Western Australia
Shrubs
Drought-tolerant trees
Trees of Australia
Taxa named by Ferdinand von Mueller